Adhives Eloaibah Gadharu Kuran is a Maldivian romantic drama television series developed for Television Maldives by Fathimath Nahula. Produced by Ismail Shafeeq, the series stars Fathimath Fareela, Mohamed Faisal, Aminath Rishfa and Mariyam Shakeela in pivotal roles. The first season of the series was aired on Television Maldives in 2012. A second season titled, Adhives Eloaibah Gadharu Kuran: Eloabeege Handhaanugai was aired in 2013.

Premise

Season 1
Mohamed Asim (Mohamed Faisal), the only child of Aasha (Mariyam Shakeela) born from an extramarital affair, struggles to find acceptance in society due to his parents' infidelity. His father, Fahumee Riza (Mohamed Rasheed), refuses to acknowledge Asim, claiming the risk of losing his post as a judge. Asim relocates to Male' for a few months seeking a job and to raise enough money to marry his girlfriend, Fazeela (Fathimath Fareela) who is mistreated by her father (Abdulla Naseer) and step-mother (Mariyam Haleem). There he meets his lookalike, Ziyad (Mohamed Faisal) and Asim visits his father who calls him a "mistake" while disowning him. On his way back to the island, Asim meets an accident and is left unconscious for four days. Desperate to flee from her abusive step-mother, Fazeela begins an affair with Zaki (Abdul Latheef), a businessman and moves to Male' with him while agreeing to marry him. Asim shares the news of grief with his mother and she dies of a heart attack. Meanwhile, Asim auditions and is ultimately selected to perform with a reputed vocalist, Mary (Aminath Rishfa). Fazeela discovers the truth of Zaki through his wife, Mary (Fathimath Mufliha).

Season 2
Aasha is revealed to be alive but paralyzed. Fazeela tries to reconcile with Asim while hoping to evade Zaki's obsession. Failing to get back with Asim, Fazeela moves back to her island. Ziyad bumps into Asim while trying to run away from Police and accidentally drops a small package of drugs. Asim reveals his identity to Ziyad and hands over the drugs to Fahumee. A heated argument between Ziyad and Fahumee results in the latter being admitted to hospital. In a call for blood donors, Zubeidha, Fahumee's wife (Neena Saleem) is surprised when Asim's blood cross-matches with Fahumee and he looks exactly the same as her son. Mary hosts a party at a resort and is smitten by the resort owner, Maan (Ahmed Asim) while she is forced into a relationship with a wealthy family friend, Shamin. Zaki deals with Fazeela's stepmother to force her marriage with him in order to prove his power. Meanwhile her father arranges her marriage with an elderly businessman.

Cast and characters

Main
 Fathimath Fareela as Fazeela
 Mohamed Faisal as Mohamed Asim / Ziyad
 Abdul Latheef as Zaki
 Aminath Rishfa as Mary
 Fathimath Mufliha as Mariyam
 Mariyam Shakeela as Aasha

Recurring
 Mohamed Rasheed as Fahumee Riza
 Mariyam Haleem as Fazee's step-mother
 Abdulla Naseer as Fazee's father
 Mohamed Rifshan as Rafeeq; Asim's friend
 Neena Saleem as Zubeidha; Ziyad's mother
 Ali Farooq as Husham; Mary's father
 Ahmed Asim as Maan, resort owner

Guest
 Ahmed Ziya as Ziyad's friend
 Hassan Liam as Ziyad's friend
 Hamdhoon Farooq as Hassan; Maan's friend

Soundtrack

References

Serial drama television series
Maldivian television shows